32 (thirty-two) is the natural number following 31 and preceding 33.

In mathematics
32 is the smallest number n with exactly 7 solutions to the equation φ(x) = n. It is also the sum of the totient function for the first ten integers.

The fifth power of two, 32 is also a Leyland number since 24 + 42 = 32.

32 is the ninth happy number.

There are collectively 32 uniform colorings to the 11 regular and semiregular tilings. 

In space groups, there are 32 three-dimensional crystallographic point groups and 32 five-dimensional crystal families.

In science
The atomic number of germanium
The freezing point of water at standard atmospheric pressure in degrees Fahrenheit

Astronomy
Messier 32, a magnitude 9.0 galaxy in the constellation Andromeda which is a companion to M31.
The New General Catalogue object NGC 32, a star in the constellation Pegasus

In music
The number of completed, numbered piano sonatas by Ludwig van Beethoven
"32 Footsteps", a song by They Might Be Giants
"The Chamber of 32 Doors", a song by Genesis, from their 1974 concept album The Lamb Lies Down on Broadway
"32", a song on Mr. Mister's debut album I Wear the Face
"32", a song by electro-rock group Carpark North
"Thirty Two", a song by Van Morrison on the album New York Sessions '67
ThirtyTwo is the fourth album by English band Reverend and the Makers
"32 Pennies", a song on Warrant's 1989 debut album Dirty Rotten Filthy Stinking Rich
The number of rays in the Japanese Rising Sun on the cover of Incubus' 2006 album Light Grenades
"32 Ways To Die", a song on Sum41's album Half Hour of Power
The shortened pseudonym of UK rapper Wretch 32

In religion

In the Kabbalah, there are 32 Kabbalistic Paths of Wisdom. This is, in turn, derived from the 32 times of the Hebrew names for God, Elohim appears in the first chapter of Genesis.

One of the central texts of the Pāli Canon in the Theravada Buddhist tradition, the Digha Nikaya, describes the appearance of the historical Buddha with a list of 32 physical characteristics.

The Hindu scripture Mudgala Purana also describes Ganesha as taking 32 forms.

In sports

 In chess, the total number of black squares on the board, the total number of white squares, and the total number of pieces (black and white) at the beginning of the game.
 The number of teams in the National Football League.
 The number of teams in the National Hockey League.
 In association football:
 The FIFA World Cup final tournament has featured 32 men's national teams from 1998 through 2022, after which the field will expand to 48.
 The FIFA Women's World Cup final tournament will feature 32 national teams starting with the next edition in 2023.
 The ball used in association football is most often made with 32 panels of leather or synthetic material.

In other fields

Thirty-two could also refer to:
The number of teeth of a full set of teeth in an adult human, including wisdom teeth
The size of a databus in bits: 32-bit
The size, in bits, of certain integer data types, used in computer representations of numbers
IPv4 uses 32-bit (4-byte) addresses
ASCII and Unicode code point for space
The code for international direct dial phone calls to Belgium
In the title Thirty-Two Short Films About Glenn Gould, starring Colm Feore
Article 32 of the UCMJ concerns pre-trial investigations. Such a hearing is often called an "Article 32 hearing"
The caliber .32 ACP
The number of the French department Gers
The traditional 32 counties of Ireland

References
 Prime Curios! 32 from the Prime Pages

Integers